Bavithra, also known as VJ Bavithra, is an Indian actress, Anchor and Model known for her works in Tamil Television as well as some new movies. She is best known for portraying the lead role in Nila. Bavithra continues to be the only Tamil woman to have ever won the Miss South India beauty pageant.

Career 
Bavithra is an MBA graduate and worked at a corporate for 3 years before embarking onto her passion in modelling and anchoring. In 2016, she debuted as one of the lead actresses with 50/50 pairing with V. Sethuraman.  She became a popular household face while hosting Vanakkam Tamizha, a live breakfast television show before she landed the lead role in Nila in 2019 which went on to air for more than 500 episodes.  She has also appeared in the web series Nila Nila Odi Vaa.

Filmography 
Films

Television

Awards and nominations

References

External links 

 

Living people
Tamil television actresses
Actresses from Tamil Nadu
Actresses in Tamil television
Actresses in Tamil cinema
Indian television actresses
Indian film actresses
21st-century Indian actresses
1995 births